Chen Gang may refer to:

 Chen Gang (intelligence officer) (1906–1967), early Communist intelligence officer
 Chen Gang (composer) (born 1935), famous for the Butterfly Lovers' Violin Concerto
 Chen Gang (born 1965), politician, party chief of Xiong'an New Area, Hebei
 Chen Gang (born 1966), former politician, Vice Mayor of Beijing
 Chen Gang (actor), Chinese film actor (Old Stone)
 Chen Gang (1977–2011), lecturer who killed himself upon learning he did not win an election for a college Communist Youth League secretary position, see Suicide of Chen Gang
 Gang Chen (engineer), past head of the Department of Mechanical Engineering at the Massachusetts Institute of Technology

Sports
 Chen Gang (table tennis) (born 1968), Chinese para table tennis player
 Chen Gang (footballer) (born 1972), Qingdao Hainiu F.C. player
 Chen Gang (badminton) (born 1976), Chinese badminton player